Albert Edward Thain (20 April 1900–1979) was an English footballer who played in the Football League for Bournemouth & Boscombe Athletic and Chelsea.

References

1900 births
1979 deaths
English footballers
Association football forwards
English Football League players
Southall F.C. players
Chelsea F.C. players
AFC Bournemouth players